The Cibyrrhaeot Theme, more properly the Theme of the Cibyrrhaeots, was a Byzantine theme encompassing the southern coast of Asia Minor from the early 8th to the late 12th centuries. As the Byzantine Empire's first and most important naval theme (θέμα ναυτικόν), it served chiefly to provide ships and troops for the Byzantine navy.

History
The Cibyrrhaeots derive their name from the city of Cibyrrha (it is unclear whether this is Cibyrrha the Great in Caria or Cibyrrha the Lesser in Pamphylia). The command first appears in the expedition against Carthage in 698, when a " of the Cibyrrhaeots" is attested as commanding the men from Korykos: Apsimar, who at the head of a fleet revolt became emperor as Tiberios III.

Until the 9th century, when the themes of the Aegean Sea and Samos were elevated from -level commands, the Cibyrrhaeot Theme was the only dedicated naval theme of the Empire. 

The theme encompassed the southern coast of Asia Minor (modern Turkey), from south of Miletus (which belonged to the Thracesian Theme) to the confines of the Arab borderlands in Cilicia, including the old Roman provinces of Caria, Lycia, Pamphylia and parts of Isauria, as well as the modern Dodecanese. Its geographical position made it the "front-line" theme facing the attacks of the Muslim fleets of the Levant and Egypt, and consequently the Cibyrrhaeots played a major role in the naval aspect of the Byzantine–Arab Wars. The land, which was known for its fertility, suffered from the frequent and devastating Arab raids, which largely depopulated the countryside except for the fortified cities and naval bases. 

He drew an annual salary of 10 pounds of gold, and his overall rank in the imperial hierarchy was relatively low, but still senior to any other naval commander: twenty-fifth in the Taktikon Uspensky of 842/843, dropping to fifty-fifth in the Escorial Taktikon of 971–975. These were the descendants of several thousand people transplanted from the area of Lebanon and settled there by Emperor Justinian II in the 680s to provide crews and marines for the fleet. In the early 9th century, the thematic fleet of the Cibyrrhaeots comprised 70 ships; and in the Cretan expedition of 911, the Cibyrrhaeot theme sent 31 warships – 15 large dromons and 16 middle-sized  – with 6,000 oarsmen and 760 marines.

Most of its territory was lost to the Seljuk Turks after the 1071 Battle of Manzikert, but recovered under Alexios I Komnenos. The rump theme was finally abolished by Manuel I Komnenos, and the territory in Caria subordinated to the theme Mylasa and Melanoudion.

References

Sources

Themes of the Byzantine Empire
Byzantine navy
Byzantine Anatolia
States and territories established in the 8th century
Arab–Byzantine wars
States and territories disestablished in the 12th century
Medieval Aegean Sea